AXN is a pay-television channel (and various local channels) owned by Sony Pictures Television.

AXN may also refer to:
 Alexandria Municipal Airport's IATA code
 Alexon Group's London Stock Exchange symbol
 AXN, an option package for the Chevrolet Silverado